Saddleback High School is a six-year IB secondary school located in Santa Ana, California, United States, and is part of the Santa Ana Unified School District. The school was established in 1967. Its mascot is the roadrunner, and its colors are green, gold, and white.

The school principal from 2009 to June 2015 was Dr. Robert Laxton.  The current principal is Edward Bustamante.

Saddleback High School has adopted the nickname "The College Majors School".

The very first CIF Champions in school history was under the leadership of Coach Jim Knapp (Track and Field), in 1973. The track athletes were all sophomores, John Peterson, Scott Brooklyn, Danny Ruvolo, and Sammy Murrietta

Notable alumni 

 Daniel Arreola - sportscaster for Fox Sports International
 David Bernal - dancer, performed "Robot Dance" at the 2001 Kollaboration competition
 Danny Lee Clark - voice and film actor, gladiator turned host of American Gladiators
 Jere Fields - film and television actress
 Tony Guerrero -  jazz musician, composer, producer and writer
 Henry Hate - celebrity tattoo artist and visual artist
 Rishard Matthews - wide receiver, Miami Dolphins, Tennessee Titans, 2012–2019 
 Erasmo Ramirez - professional baseball player
 Carlos Rincon - film executive, producer, agent
 Ronny Rios - Mexican-American professional boxer in the Super Featherweight division
 Terry Rossio - screenwriter and film producer, Shrek and Pirates of the Caribbean: The Curse of the Black Pearl 
 Eddie "Piolín" Sotelo - Spanish-media radio host, KSCA FM

References

External links 
 Saddleback High School website

Educational institutions established in 1967
High schools in Santa Ana, California
Public high schools in California
1967 establishments in California